WURH-CD, virtual channel 13 (UHF digital channel 29), is a low-powered, Class A television station licensed to Miami, Florida, United States, simulcasting the third digital subchannel of PBS member station WPBT (channel 2). Owned by South Florida PBS, WURH-CD and WPBT are sisters to Boynton Beach-licensed fellow PBS member WXEL-TV (channel 42). The three stations share transmitter facilities on Northwest 199th Street in Andover, Florida.

History
On October 16, 1990, construction permit 890310UU became W25BF. On July 7, 1997, W25BF became WIMP-LP. WIMP became a class A station on September 18, 2001, and became WIMP-CA as a result. After a flash-cut to digital TV while staying on physical channel 25, it became WIMP-CD in November 2011.

Then-owner Sunshine Broadcasting Company sold WIMP-CD's spectrum as part of the broadcast incentive auction, for $3,138,184. On December 15, 2017, Sunshine Broadcasting closed on the donation of the station to South Florida PBS, Inc. It planned to enter into a channel-sharing arrangement to operate the station on the spectrum allocated to their WPBT. The station changed its call sign to WURH-CD on December 27, 2017.

The station was previously affiliated with HSN, and Elementos TV, a Hispanic TV network from Salt Lake City, Utah.

Digital channel

References

External links
 

URH-CD
Low-power television stations in the United States
Television channels and stations established in 1997
1997 establishments in Florida